The Journal of Psychotherapy Integration is a peer-reviewed academic journal published by the American Psychological Association on behalf of the Society for the Exploration of Psychotherapy Integration. It was established in 1991 and covers research in psychotherapy. The editor-in-chief is Jennifer Callahan (University of North Texas).

Abstracting and indexing
The journal is abstracted and indexed in:

References

External links
 

American Psychological Association academic journals
English-language journals
Integrative psychotherapy
Psychotherapy journals
Quarterly journals
Publications established in 1991